Mikhail Ivanovich Yakimovich (born January 13, 1967) is a former Belarusian handball player. Throughout his senior career, Yakimovich played for SKA Minsk in the Soviet Union/Belarus, and later for Teka Cantabria and Portland San Antonio in Spain. Besides numerous other achievements, he won the EHF Champions League with all the three teams.

In 1990 he won a silver medal on the World Championship as a member of the Soviet Union team. Two years later he won the gold medal on the 1992 Olympics with the Unified Team. After the Soviet Union was disbanded, he opted to play for the national team of his native Belarus. He participated on several tournaments with the Belarusian team, and although they never won any medals, he gained several individual recognitions, like coming in as the third best scorer overall on the 1995 World Championship.

References

External links
Mikhail Yakimovich biography & statistics

1967 births
Living people
People from Slutsk
Belarusian male handball players
Olympic handball players of the Unified Team
Soviet male handball players
Handball players at the 1992 Summer Olympics
Olympic gold medalists for the Unified Team
Liga ASOBAL players
Olympic medalists in handball
Medalists at the 1992 Summer Olympics
Belarusian expatriate sportspeople in Spain
Sportspeople from Minsk Region